Aliabad-e Darreh Dur (also Romanized as ‘Alīābād-e Darreh Dūr; also known as ‘Alīābād and ‘Alīābād-e Khān) is a village in Darreh Doran Rural District, in the Central District of Rafsanjan County, Kerman Province, Iran. At the 2006 census, its population was 45, in 12 families.

References 

Populated places in Rafsanjan County